The 2018–19 Northern Colorado Bears men's basketball team represented the University of Northern Colorado during the 2018–19 NCAA Division I men's basketball season. The Bears were led by third-year head coach Jeff Linder and played their home games at Bank of Colorado Arena in Greeley, Colorado as members of the Big Sky Conference. They finished the season 21–11, 15–5 in Big Sky play to finish in second place. They lost in the quarterfinals of the Big Sky tournament to Southern Utah.

Previous season
The Bears finished the 2017–18 season 26–12, 11–7 in Big Sky play to finish in fifth place. They defeated Northern Arizona and Weber State to advance to the semifinals of the Big Sky tournament to Montana. They were invited to the CollegeInsider.com Tournament where they defeated Drake, San Diego, Sam Houston State and UIC to become CIT champions.

Departures

Incoming transfers

2018 incoming recruits

2019 incoming recruits

Roster

Schedule and results

|-
!colspan=9 style=|Exhibition

|-
!colspan=9 style=|Non-conference regular season

|-
!colspan=9 style=| Big Sky regular season

|-
!colspan=9 style=| Big Sky tournament

Source

References

Northern Colorado Bears men's basketball seasons
Northern Colorado
Northern Colorado Bears men's basketball
Northern Colorado Bears men's basketball